Warren Ballpark is a baseball stadium located in Bisbee, Arizona. The ballpark was recently home to the Tucson Saguaros of the Pecos League and the Bisbee-Douglas Copper Kings of the independent Arizona–Mexico League  The Stadium was built in 1909 by the Calumet and Arizona Mining Company (which later merged with Phelps Dodge) as a recreation for the miners and their families, pre-dating the construction of Chicago's Wrigley Field by nearly five years. It is currently the home of Bisbee Killer Termites  and Bisbee High School Pumas baseball and football teams.

It is divided into two sections: a baseball field on the East side, and a football stadium on the West. The baseball field features a shaded cast-in-place concrete grandstand situated at the Northeast corner. This canopy-covered structure, built in 1909, is still in its original condition, and is listed as a state historic building. Despite ongoing maintenance by the City of Bisbee and the Bisbee Unified School districts, it will most likely need structural renovation at some point in the future. Underneath the grandstand are housed the concrete dugouts, locker rooms, showers and manager's offices. The football field is oriented North to South and consists of a gridiron with modern steel bleachers along both sides of its length. These bleachers have at times in the past been pushed back to expand the baseball outfield.

Warren Ballpark holds a place in American labor history as the location where 1,300 striking, kidnapped miners were held during the Bisbee Deportation in 1917.

Gallery

References

 
 
 
 
 
 Gabby Giffords, Recognizing Bisbee's Warren Park – (Extensions of Remarks – July 16, 2009), Congressional Record, 111th Congress (2009–2010)

External links
 Friends of Warren Ballpark
 Photos and description of Warren Ballpark by digitalballparks.com

Baseball venues in Arizona
Buildings and structures in Cochise County, Arizona
Sports venues in Arizona
Tourist attractions in Cochise County, Arizona
1909 establishments in Arizona Territory
Bisbee, Arizona
Event venues on the National Register of Historic Places in Arizona
National Register of Historic Places in Cochise County, Arizona
Sports venues on the National Register of Historic Places in Arizona
Sports venues completed in 1909